Erythroxylum pacificum is a species of plant in the Erythroxylaceae family. It is endemic to Peru.

References

pacificum
Endemic flora of Peru
Vulnerable plants
Taxonomy articles created by Polbot